Marsha Isack Lester is an American physical chemist. She is currently the Edmund J. Kahn Distinguished Professor of Chemistry at the University of Pennsylvania. Lester uses both theoretical and experimental methods to study the physical chemistry of volatile organic compounds present in the earth's atmosphere. Her current work focuses on the hydroxyl radical and Criegee intermediates.

Education
Lester graduated with a B.A. from Douglass Residential College, an institution for women within Rutgers University, in 1976. She then earned her Ph.D. from Columbia University in 1981 in the laboratory of George Flynn. Her thesis was entitled Vibrational Relaxation Dynamics in Bulk Gases and Supersonic Molecular Beams. She carried out postdoctoral work as a National Science Foundation Fellow at Bell Laboratories from 1981 to 1982.

Career 
Currently she works as a professor at University of Pennsylvania from which she has received the Edmund J. and Louise W. Kahn Award in the Natural Sciences. Lester was the first female chair of the department of chemistry, a position she held from 2005 to 2009. She was a founder, and is currently chair, of the Penn Forum for Women Faculty, a group formed to support female faculty at the university. Lester is also well known as the editor (until 2019) of the Journal of Chemical Physics.

Previously, Lester was the chair of the Division of Laser Science of the American Physical Society. She also worked for American Chemical Society. Later on, she was the chair of the Department of Energy's Council for Chemical and Biochemical Sciences.

Research 
Lester's research group utilizes theoretical and experimental approaches to study chemical reactions. She focuses on modeling potential energy surfaces between reactive partners, with an emphasis on volatile organic compounds present in the earth's atmosphere. She has published extensively on the interactions and reactions of the hydroxyl radical. Lester's group was the first to obtain an infrared spectrum of the hydrogen trioxide radical. Her lab currently works on modeling the stability of this radical and its conformers.

Currently, her group focuses on photo-induced chemistry of Criegee intermediates, an intermediate in the alkene ozonolysis pathway. This pathway is a primary oxidation pathway for alkenes in the troposphere and generates atmospheric hydroxyl radicals. Her lab synthesizes Criegee intermediates in order to further study their chemical reactions using spectroscopy.

Her lab also currently focuses on modeling and observing the collisional quenching of excited hydroxyl radicals. Quenching impacts the concentration of hydroxyl radicals in the atmosphere, and is therefore of environmental interest.

Her research group at the University of Pennsylvania was behind the development of open shell complexes.

Awards 
Herbert P. Broida Prize (2019)
Member of the National Academy of Sciences (2016)
Garvan-Olin Medal of the American Chemical Society (2014)
Fellow of the American Chemical Society (2010)
Fellow of American Academy of Arts & Sciences (2008)
 Bourke lectureship from Faraday Division of the Royal Society of Chemistry (2005)
Guggenheim Fellowship (2002–03)
Fellow of the American Association for the Advancement of Science (1997)
Fellow of the American Physical Society (1993) 
Alfred P. Sloan Research Fellowship (1987)
Camille and Henry Dreyfus Teacher–Scholar Award (1986)

References

Year of birth missing (living people)
20th-century births
Living people
21st-century American physicists
Columbia University alumni
American women physicists
Members of the United States National Academy of Sciences
Fellows of the American Academy of Arts and Sciences
Fellows of the American Association for the Advancement of Science
Fellows of the American Physical Society
Fellows of the American Chemical Society
The Journal of Chemical Physics editors
William Allen High School alumni
Christopher H. Browne Distinguished Professor
21st-century American women scientists